Jabez J. Parker served as the 15th Secretary of State of Alabama from 1870 to 1872.

References

Year of birth missing
Year of death missing
Alabama Democrats
Secretaries of State of Alabama